Aaron Colvin (born October 2, 1991) is a former American football cornerback. He played college football at Oklahoma and was drafted by the Jacksonville Jaguars in the fourth round of the 2014 NFL Draft. He has also played for the Houston Texans.

High school
Colvin attended Owasso High School in Owasso, Oklahoma, where he played high school football. He recorded 72 tackles, two interceptions while breaking up 10 passes and scoring five touchdowns in 2009. He was recognized as first-team All-State by both the Tulsa World and The Oklahoman in 2009, and was also the district 6A-4 defensive player of the year.

Considered a three-star recruit by Rivals.com, he was rated as the 31st best cornerback prospect in the nation. He committed to Oklahoma over offers from Oklahoma State, Missouri and Tulsa.

College career
As a freshman, Colvin played in all 14 games, primarily on special teams and as a backup cornerback. He amassed 21 tackles, three for loss, three pass breakups and one forced fumble. In 2011, he was moved to strong safety and led the team with 84 tackles, including 4.5 for loss, and six pass breakups. As a junior in 2012, Colvin was moved back to cornerback. He started all 13 games, and finished tied for second in the Big 12 with four interceptions. He also recorded 61 tackles, including 2.5 for loss, and eleven pass breakups while earning first-team All-Big 12 honors. In 2013, he played in 11 games, recording 55 tackles, including five for loss, one interception and three pass breakups. He ended his career earning a first-team All-Big 12 selection.

Professional career
On December 16, 2013, it was announced that Colvin had accepted his invitation to play in the 2014 Senior Bowl. On January 21, 2014, it was reported that Colvin had torn his ACL in his right knee during a Senior Bowl practice. At the time of his injury he was rated as the fourth best cornerback prospect in the upcoming draft by ESPN analyst Mel Kiper Jr. and was projected to be selected in the first three rounds. At the conclusion of the pre-draft process, Colvin was projected to be a late round pick.

Jacksonville Jaguars
The Jacksonville Jaguars selected Colvin in the fourth round (114th overall) of the 2014 NFL Draft. Colvin was the 12th cornerback drafted in 2014. The pick that was used to select Colvin was acquired in a trade that sent Eugene Monroe to the Baltimore Ravens.

2014
On May 21, 2014, the Jacksonville Jaguars signed Colvin to a four-year, $2.67 million contract that includes a signing bonus of $453,152.

His knee injury sidelined him for the Jaguars’ entire training camp, preseason, and their first ten regular seasons games. On November 12, 2014, the Jacksonville Jaguars officially activated Colvin off of their physically unable to perform list. Upon joining the active roster, Colvin was named the third cornerback on the depth chart by head coach Gus Bradley. He began the season behind starting cornerbacks Dwayne Gratz and Demetrius McCray.

On November 23, 2014, Colvin made his professional regular season debut and recorded one tackle during the Jaguars’ 23-3 loss at the Indianapolis Colts in Week 12. On November 30, 2014, Colvin recorded four combined tackles, broke up a pass, and returned a fumble for a 41-yard touchdown during a 25-24 win against the New York Giants. Colvin recovered a fumble after the ball was fumbled by Giants’ tight end Larry Donnell after it was jarred loose by Dwayne Gratz during the fourth quarter. The Jaguars went on to complete a 21-point comeback, the largest in team history, and earn their second win of the season. In Week 16, he collected a season-high seven solo tackles and deflected a pass during a 23-13 victory against the Tennessee Titans. On December 28, 2014, Colvin earned his first career start and recorded four combined tackles during a 23-17 loss at the Houston Texans in Week 17. He finished his rookie season in 2014 with 27 combined tackles (23 solo), two pass deflections, one fumble recovery, and one touchdown in six games and one start.

2015
Throughout training camp, Colvin competed to be a starting cornerback against Dwayne Gratz and Demetrius McCray. Head coach Gus Bradley named Colvin and Davon House the starting cornerbacks to start the regular season in 2015. On October 4, 2015, Colvin recorded six combined tackles and made his first career sack on Colts’ quarterback Andrew Luck during a 16-13 loss at the Indianapolis Colts in Week 4. In Week 16, he collected a season-high nine combined tackles as the Jaguars lost 38-17 at the New Orleans Saints. Colvin finished the 2017 NFL season with a career-high 73 combined tackles (60 solo), seven pass deflections, four sacks, and one forced fumble in 16 games and 15 starts.

2016
On April 8, 2016, it was announced that Colvin had violated the NFL’s performance-enhancing substances policy and would be suspended for the first four games of the 2016 NFL season. Colvin entered training camp as a backup cornerback after the Jaguars signed free agent cornerback Prince Amukamara and drafted cornerback Jalen Ramsey in the first round (fifth overall) during the 2016 NFL Draft. Upon his return from suspension, Colvin was named the fourth cornerback on the Jaguars’ depth chart. He began Week 6 listed behind Davon House, Jalen Ramsey, and Prince Amukamara. In Week 9, Colvin collected a season-high seven combined tackles during a 19-14 loss at the Kansas City Chiefs. On December 18, 2016, the Jacksonville Jaguars fired head coach Gus Bradley after they fell to a 2-12 record. Assistant head coach Doug Marrone was named the interim head coach for the remainder of the season. On December 23, 2016, the Jacksonville Jaguars placed Colvin on injured reserve due to an ankle injury. Colvin finished the 2016 NFL season with 22 combined tackles (18 solo) and one pass deflection in ten games and four starts.

2017
Colvin entered training camp slated as the third cornerback on the depth chart. Head coach Doug Marrone retained Todd Wash as the defensive coordinator and named Colvin the third cornerback on the depth chart to start the season, behind Jalen Ramsey and A. J. Bouye. In Week 5, Colvin collected a season-high ten combined tackles (nine solo) during a 30–9 win at the Pittsburgh Steelers. He played in all 16 games with five starts, recording 45 combined tackles (28 solo) and five passes defensed. Colvin was one of two cornerbacks not to allow any touchdowns during the season. He played 672 defensive snaps and received an overall grade of 80.0 from Pro Football Focus.

The Jacksonville Jaguars finished first in the AFC South with a 10–6 record and earned a playoff berth. On January 7, 2018, Colvin appeared in his first career playoff game and recorded one solo tackle, deflected a pass, and made his first career interception as the Jaguars defeated the Buffalo Bills 10–3 in the AFC Wildcard Game. Colvin intercepted a pass by Bills’ quarterback Tyrod Taylor, that was originally intended for tight end Logan Thomas and was deflected by Jaguars’ linebacker Myles Jack during the second quarter. The following week, the Jaguars defeated the Pittsburgh Steelers 45–42 in the AFC Divisional Round before being eliminated from the playoffs after a 24–20 loss at the New England Patriots in the AFC Championship Game.

Houston Texans

2018
On March 13, 2018, the Houston Texans signed Colvin to a four-year, $34 million contract that includes $18 million guaranteed and a signing bonus of $4 million.

Colvin entered training camp slated as the first-team nickelback and third cornerback on the depth chart. Head coach Bill O’Brien named Colvin the third cornerback on the depth chart to begin the regular season, behind Johnathan Joseph and Kevin Johnson.

On September 11, 2018, Colvin became a starting cornerback after Kevin Johnson was placed on injured reserve. Colvin was inactive for three games (Weeks 5-7) due to an ankle injury.

2019
On September 10, 2019, Colvin was released by the Texans after giving up a catch on Monday Night Football to Ted Ginn Jr. to put the Saints in field goal range that possibly helped cost the Houston Texans the game with Wil Lutz nailing a 58 yarder field goal and Colvin's team losing that MNF game to New Orleans 30-28.

Washington Redskins / Football Team

On September 13, 2019, Colvin signed a one-year contract with the Washington Redskins. Colvin re-signed on May 14, 2020. He was released during final roster cuts on September 5, 2020, and signed to the practice squad the next day. His practice squad contract with the team expired after the season on January 18, 2021.

References

External links
Oklahoma Sooners bio

1991 births
Living people
Sportspeople from Tulsa, Oklahoma
Players of American football from Oklahoma
American football cornerbacks
University of Oklahoma alumni
Oklahoma Sooners football players
Jacksonville Jaguars players
Houston Texans players
Washington Redskins players
People from Old Hickory, Tennessee
Washington Football Team players
Ed Block Courage Award recipients